Josef Kouba (21 March 1880 – 15 February 1951) was a Czechoslovak composer. His work was part of the music event in the art competition at the 1948 Summer Olympics.

References

1880 births
1951 deaths

Czechoslovak composers
Olympic competitors in art competitions
Musicians from Prague